Steffi Graf was the defending champion and won in the final 6–1, 6–4 against Ann Henricksson.

Seeds
A champion seed is indicated in bold text while text in italics indicates the round in which that seed was eliminated.

  Steffi Graf (champion)
  Manuela Maleeva (second round)
  Natasha Zvereva (first round)
  Claudia Kohde-Kilsch (first round)
  Patty Fendick (quarterfinals)
  Hana Mandlíková (semifinals)
  Gretchen Magers (first round)
  Terry Phelps (quarterfinals)

Draw

References
 1989 U.S. Women's Hard Court Championships Draw

Women's Singles
Singles
Women's sports in Connecticut